William Brown Street in Liverpool, England, is a road that is remarkable for its concentration of public buildings. It is sometimes referred to as the "Cultural Quarter".

Originally known as Shaw's Brow, a coaching road east from the city, it is named after William Brown, a local MP and philanthropist, who in 1860 donated land in the area for the building of a library and museum. This area gives its name as the William Brown Street conservation area.

Buildings of note
The conservation area contains:

Lime Street Station
St George's Hall
William Brown Library and Museum — housing part of World Museum Liverpool and part of Liverpool Central Library
Great North Western Hotel
Walker Art Gallery
Picton Reading Room and Hornby Library — part of Liverpool Central Library
County Sessions House
College of Technology and Museum Extension — part of World Museum Liverpool
The Wellington Memorial
The Steble Fountain
St John's Gardens
Liverpool Empire Theatre
Entrance to Queensway Tunnel

External links

Streets in Liverpool